Romel Raffin (born April 23, 1954, in Toronto, Ontario) is a three-time Canadian Olympian in men's basketball.

A resident of Kitchener, Ontario, Raffin played for Canada at the 1976, 1984, and 1988 Summer Olympics.  He was a member of the 1980 team as well which had qualified for the tournament but did not participate due to the Canadian Olympic Committee's decision to boycott the Moscow games.

A centre-forward, Raffin played college basketball for the Penn State Nittany Lions from 1974 to 1978.  He played professionally in Italy for one year and spent another year playing pro in Venezuela, with Cocodrilos de Caracas.

In the early 80's Raffin taught physical education, as well as some other courses at Woodman Jr. High in Calgary.

Raffin became basketball coach at Central Memorial High School in Calgary in 1989 and the school's athletic director in 1994.  He was inducted as a player into the Canadian Basketball Hall of Fame in 1996.

See also
List of Pennsylvania State University Olympians

Sources
bigten.cstv.com
curtisphillips.tripod.com
www.canada.com/calgaryherald
www.naismithmuseum.com
sports-reference

1954 births
Living people
Basketball players at the 1976 Summer Olympics
Basketball players at the 1984 Summer Olympics
Basketball players at the 1988 Summer Olympics
Basketball players at the 1987 Pan American Games
Canadian basketball coaches
Canadian expatriate basketball people in Italy
Canadian expatriate basketball people in the United States
Canadian expatriate sportspeople in Venezuela
Canadian men's basketball players
1974 FIBA World Championship players
Centers (basketball)
Cocodrilos de Caracas players
High school basketball coaches in the United States
Olympic basketball players of Canada
Pan American Games competitors for Canada
Penn State Nittany Lions basketball players
Power forwards (basketball)
Basketball players from Toronto
Universiade medalists in basketball
Universiade gold medalists for Canada
Medalists at the 1983 Summer Universiade